The 1938 Jersey Airport disaster occurred at 10:50am on Friday 4 November 1938 when the Jersey Airways de Havilland D.H.86 airliner St Catherine's Bay (G-ACZN) crashed in the parish of Saint Brelade, 500 yards east of Jersey Airport, killing the pilot and all twelve passengers on board as well as farm hand Edmund Le Cornu, who was working on the ground. In terms of loss of life, it was the worst crash of a rigid aircraft on British territory to date and the second-worst overall crash of a British rigid aircraft after the crash of an Imperial Airways airliner in Belgium in 1933 (in which 15 people died).

The airliner had just taken off from Jersey en route to Southampton. The sky was overcast, with a cloud base of 120–150 feet. The aircraft had been fully inspected and was not carrying a full load.

The Air Ministry investigation concluded that the accident was due to pilot error. The pilot had made a climbing turn into the clouds and inadvertently allowed the aircraft to sideslip when he was still too close to the ground to avert disaster. The aircraft had exploded and several bodies had been thrown up to 40 feet away.

Among the dead were the daughter, son-in-law and baby granddaughter of surveyor and aerial archaeology pioneer G. A. Beazeley.

Footnotes

References
"Jersey Air Disaster Inquest", The Times, 7 November 1938
"Crash that Caused 14 Deaths 'An Error of Airmanship'", The Times, 19 April 1939
From Sea Eagle to Flamingo: a history of Channel Island Airways, Neville Doyle, 1991 (Self Publishing Association)

External links
Details on PlaneCrashInfo.com

Jersey Airways accidents and incidents
Aviation accidents and incidents in 1938
Airliner accidents and incidents caused by pilot error
History of Jersey
Aviation in Jersey
Saint Brélade
1938 in Jersey
Aviation accidents and incidents in the Channel Islands
November 1938 events
Disasters in Jersey